The following is a list of notable events and releases of the year 2018 in Finnish music.

Events

January 
 12 – The 22nd Folklandia Cruise start in Helsinki (January 12 – 13).
 13 –  Composer Paavo Heininen, considered by many to be Finland's most influential musician, celebrates his 80th birthday with a concert at the Järvenpää Hall, Helsinki.

February 
 11 – The Kokkola Winter Accordion Festival start (February 11 – 18).

March 
 8 – The Turku Jazz Festival start in Åbo (March 8 – 11).
 12 – The Finnish Radio Symphony Orchestra, under Hannu Lintu, begins a week-long series of concerts in Germany.
 27 – The Hetta Music Event start in Enontekiö (March 27 - April 1).

April 
 11 – The Tampere Biennale start (April 11 – 15).
 25 – The 32nd April Jazz Espoo start (April 25 – 29).

May 
 9 – The Vaasa Choir Festival start (May 9 – 13).

June 
 3 – The VocalEspoo Festival start (June 3 – 9).

July 
 6 – The Baltic Jazz festival start in Dalsbruk (July 6 – 8).
 9 – The 51st Kaustinen Folk Music Festival start (July 9 – 15).
 14 – The 53rd Pori Jazz Festival start in Pori, Finland (July 14 – 22).

August 
 7 – The Rauma Festivo Music Festival start (August 7–11).

September 
 6 – The Lahti Sibelius Festival start (September 6–9).

See also 
 2018 in Finland
 Music of Finland
 Finland in the Eurovision Song Contest 2018

References

 
Finnish music
Finnish